Thurntaxisia is a genus of beetles in the family Buprestidae, containing the following species:

 Thurntaxisia alexandri Schatzmayr, 1929
 Thurntaxisia cottyi (Fairmairei, 1866)
 Thurntaxisia schoemani (Holm, 1982)

References

Buprestidae genera